Polona Reberšak (born 9 February 1987) is a Slovenian former professional tennis player. Today she is a stringer to professional tennis player Naomi Osaka.

In her career, Reberšak won one singles title and 12 doubles titles on the ITF Circuit. On 10 July 2006, she reached her best singles ranking of world No. 496. On 30 October 2006, she peaked at No. 506 in the doubles rankings.

Reberšak made three appearances for the Slovenia Fed Cup team in April 2006.

ITF Circuit finals

Singles: 3 (1 title, 2 runner-ups)

Doubles: 22 (12 titles, 10 runner-ups)

Fed Cup participation

Singles

External links
 
 
 

1987 births
Living people
Sportspeople from Celje
Slovenian female tennis players